Kepler-182 is a star in the constellation of Cygnus. In the night sky, it is located at right ascension  and declination . The star is notable for having two planets in the circumstellar habitable zone.

Two exoplanets orbit it.

References

Planetary systems with two confirmed planets
546
Cygnus (constellation)